Virginia's 58th House of Delegates district elects one of 100 seats in the Virginia House of Delegates, the lower house of the state's bicameral legislature. District 58 represents Greene County as well as parts of Albemarle, Fluvanna, and Rockingham counties. The seat is currently held by Republican Robert B. Bell, who was first elected in November 2001.

District officeholders
 George Allen (R): January 12, 1983 – November 5, 1991
 Peter T. Way (R): 1992 – 1997
 Paul C. Harris (R): January 14, 1998 – January 9, 2002
 Rob Bell (R): January 9, 2002 – present

Population and geography
The district's boundaries changed on April 29, 2011 to adjust for population changes measured by the 2010 U.S. Census of Population, so that each district would have about 80,000 residents. The changes reduced the size of the part of the district east of Charlottesville and just around the city, and expanded it toward the northwest.

References

Virginia House of Delegates districts
Greene County, Virginia
Albemarle County, Virginia
Fluvanna County, Virginia
Rockingham County, Virginia